The following is a list of notable deaths in February 1998.

Entries for each day are listed alphabetically by surname. A typical entry lists information in the following sequence:
 Name, age, country of citizenship at birth, subsequent country of citizenship (if applicable), reason for notability, cause of death (if known), and reference.

February 1998

1
Robert Creighton Buck, 77, American mathematician.
Jack T. Collis, 75, American art director.
Marga Faulstich, 82, German glass chemist.
Gérard Séty, 75, a French actor.
Sheila Watson, 88, Canadian novelist and literary critic.

2
Raymond Cattell, 92, British and American psychologist.
Duilio Del Prete, 59, Italian actor, dubber and singer-songwriter, cancer.
Gertrude Scharff Goldhaber, 86, German-American nuclear physicist.
Ferdinand A. Hermens, 91, German-American political scientist and economist.
Viljo Kajava, 88, Finnish poet and writer.
Robert McIntyre, 84, Scottish politician.
Baldev Singh, 93, Indian neurologist.
Roger L. Stevens, 87, American theatrical producer, arts administrator, and real estate executive.
Haroun Tazieff, 83, French volcanologist and geologist.
Manuel Delgado Villegas, 55, Spanish serial killer, chronic obstructive pulmonary disease.
Zahari Zhandov, 86, Bulgarian film director, script writer and cinematographer.

3
Joey Archibald, 83, American boxer.
Clark Goff, 80, American gridiron football player.
Bertram Heyn, 85, Sri Lankan general and cricketer.
Davy Kaye, 81, British actor and entertainer.
Gabriel Laub, 69, Czechoslovak journalist and writer.
Fat Pat, 27, American rapper, murdered.
Karla Faye Tucker, 38, American convicted murderer, executed by lethal injection.

4
Eranuhi Aslamazyan, 88, Armenian and Soviet graphic artist.
Jean Blackwell Hutson, 83, African-American librarian, writer and curator.
Zoran Kosanović, 42, Serbian Canadian table tennis player, heart attack.
Aruna Lama, 52, Nepali singer.
Menachem Shmuel David Raichik, 79, American Orthodox rabbi.
Michel Roux, 73, French baritone.
Rees Stephens, 75, Welsh rugby player.
Cristóbal Martínez-Bordiú, 10th Marquis of Villaverde, 75, Spanish aristocrat and son in law of dictator Francisco Franco.

5
Wilbur Coen, 86, American tennis player.
Douglas Gamley, 73, Australian composer.
Margaret Hillis, 76, American conductor.
Tim Kelly, 35, American guitarist of the band Slaughter, car accident.
Kim Ki-young, 78, South Korean film director, domestic accident.
Eduardo Francisco Pironio, 77, Argentine Roman Catholic cardinal, bone cancer.
Joe Stubbs, American R&B/Soul singer, heart failure.
Chikuzan Takahashi, 87, Japanese Tsugaru-jamisen performer and composer.
Hans Wallach, 93, German-American experimental psychologist.
Nick Webb, 43, English acoustic guitarist and composer, pancreatic cancer.

6
Nazim al-Kudsi, 91, former President and Prime Minister of Syria.
Falco, 40, Austrian singer and songwriter ("Rock Me Amadeus"), traffic accident.
Tony LeVier, 84, American air racer and test pilot, cancer.
Ferenc Sidó, 74, Czechoslovak table tennis player.
Toshiaki Tanaka, 62, Japanese table tennis player.
Carl Wilson, 51, American musician, singer, and songwriter (The Beach Boys), lung cancer.
Claude Érignac, 60, French prefect of Corsica, murdered.

7
Gunther Baumann, 77, German football player and manager.
Ascanio Cortés, 83, Chilean football player.
Bobby Kemp, 38, American football player, suicide.
Norman J. Levy, 67, American lawyer and politician.
Lawrence Sanders, 77, American novelist and short story writer.

8
Elizabeth Bauer Mock, American professor, curator, author and journalist.
Tulsiram Sharma Kashyap, 58, Indian writer and politician.
Halldór Laxness, 95, Icelandic writer and Nobel Prize laureate, Alzheimer's disease.
Enoch Powell, 85, British politician, classical scholar, author and philologist, Parkinson's disease.
Rocke Robertson, 85, American physician.
J. B. Salsberg, 95, Canadian politician.
Julian Simon, 65, American economist and author, heart attack.

9
George Cafego, 82, American football player and coach.
Cyrille Delannoit, 71, Belgian middleweight boxing champion.
Bill Froats, 67, American baseball player.
Gabriel Gobin, 94, Belgian film actor.
Dean Griffing, 82, American gridiron football player, coach and executive.
Alf Jefferies, 76, English footballer.
Panagiotis Katsouris, 21, Greek footballer, traffic collision.
Nick Leluk, 62, Canadian politician.
William Ronald, 71, Canadian painter.
Maurice Schumann, 86, French politician, journalist and writer.

10
Ramchandran Jaikumar, 53, Indian-American scientist, heart attack.
Richard Kotuk, 54, American journalist, producer and filmmaker, heart attack.
Alex Kramer, 94, Canadian songwriter.
Peter Longbottom, 38, British cyclist, traffic collision.
Paul MacKendrick, 83, American classicist, author, and teacher.
Erich Mückenberger, 87, German socialist politician.
Félix Reina, 76, Cuban violinist, arranger and composer, stroke.

11
Joy Buba, 93, American sculptor and illustrator.
Patrick Clark, 42, American chef, amyloidosis.
Tanvir Dar, 50, Pakistani field hockey player and Olympian.
Thomas Gerard Dunn, 76, American politician.
Mike Fornieles, 66, Cuban-American baseball player.
Lily Harmon, American visual artist.
Jonathan Hole, 93, American actor.
Josef Issels, 90, German physician, pneumonia.
Radhanath Rath, 101, Indian journalist, activist and politician.

12
Gardner Ackley, 82, American economist and diplomat.
Lionel Aldridge, 56, American gridiron football player.
Lauri Kivekäs, 94, Finnish businessman and politician.
George Humphrey Middleton, 88, British diplomat.
Ralf Reichenbach, 47, German shot putter and Olympian.

13
José Barraquer, 82, Spanish ophthalmologist.
Thomas Chapin, 40, American composer and musician, leukemia.
Jo Clayton, 58, American fantasy and science fiction author, multiple myeloma.
John Cowley, 74, Irish actor.
Hans Diergaardt, 70, Namibian politician.
Bryan MacMahon, 88, Irish writer.
Alfred Struwe, 70, German actor, pneumonia.
Ladislav Štípek, 73, Czechoslovak table tennis.

14
Badrul Haider Chowdhury, 73, Chief Justice of Bangladesh.
Edgar Granville, Baron Granville of Eye, 100, British politician.
Thomas McKimson, 90, American animator.
Hansel Mieth, 88, German-American photojournalist.
Denise Paulme, 88, French Africanist and anthropologist.
Manuel Pérez, 54, Colombian guerrilla leader, hepatitis.

15
Sir Samuel Curran, 85, British physicist and university administrator.
Martha Gellhorn, 89, American novelist, travel writer, and journalist, suicide.
B. Calvin Jones, 59, American archaeologist.
Louie Spicolli, 27, American professional wrestler, overdose.
George White, 86, American film editor.

16
Mary Amdur, 76, American toxicologist, heart attack.
Boris Blumin, 90, Canadian-American chess master.
Harry Hinsley, 79, British historian and cryptanalyst.
Fernando Abril Martorell, 61, former Spanish Deputy Prime Minister, lung cancer.
Sheu Yuan-dong, 70, Taiwanese politician and governor of the Central Bank, plane crash.

17
Arnold Aronson, 86, American civil rights leader.
Nicolas Bouvier, 68,Swiss writer, artist, and photographer.
Maurice Bucaille, 77, French physician and author.
Hilaire Couvreur, 73, Belgian cyclist.
Ernst Jünger, 102, German World War I hero, author and entomologist.
Ernst Käsemann, 91, German Lutheran theologian, murdered around 24 May 1977.
Bob Merrill, American songwriter, theatrical composer and screenwriter, suicide.
Sheila Raynor, 91, British actress.
Ruth Robertson, 92, American photojournalist.
Marie-Louise von Franz, 83, Swiss Jungian psychologist and scholar.
Albert Wass, 90, Hungarian nobleman, novelist and poet, suicide.

18
Lidia Bongiovanni, 83, Italian versatile athlete.
James E. Boyd, 91, American physicist and mathematician.
Harry Caray, 83, American television and radio broadcaster, heart attack.
David Crouch, 78, British politician.
Antonio Escuriet, 88, Spanish road cyclist.
Robbie James, 40, Welsh footballer, heart attack.
Scott O'Hara, 36, American pornographic performer, author, poet and publisher, AIDS.
Messias Timula, 50, Portuguese footballer.
Mya Than Tint, 68, Myanmar writer, brain hemorrhage.
Richard Crawford White, 74, American politician, heart attack.

19
Wolfgang Händler, 77, German mathematician and pioneering computer scientist.
Grandpa Jones, 84, American "old time" country and gospel music singer, stroke.
George Male, 87, English footballer.
Charlie Martin, 84, Welsh racing driver.
Mancur Olson, 66, American economist and social scientist.
Leo Righetti, 72, American baseball player.
Thomas F. Riley, 85, United States Marine Corps brigadier general, cardiac arrest.
Talish, Pakistani actor.

20
Francis Coulson, 78, British chef and hotelier.
John Fulton, 65, American bullfighter, heart attack.
Henry Livings, 68, English playwright and screenwriter.
David McClure, 72, Scottish artist and lecturer.
Ivor Mairants, 90, Polish jazz and classical guitarist, teacher and composer.
Bob McBride, 51, Canadian rock singer-songwriter, heart failure.
Virgilio Tommasi, 92, Italian long jumper and Olympian.

21
Archie Aikman, 72, Scottish football player.
Ramón Bravo, 72, Mexican diver, photographer and underwater filmmaker, heart attack.
Santos Colon, 75, Puerto Rican bolero and mambo singer.
Ellis Credle, 95, American children's author and illustrator.
James M. Edie, 70, American philosopher, cancer.
George Fant, 81, Swedish actor, director and theater manager, pneumonia.
Karl Geyer, 98, Austrian football player and coach.
Yoshio Miyajima, 89, Japanese cinematographer.
John Nicolella, 52, American film, television director and producer.
Baboo Nimal, 89, Indian field hockey player and Olympian.
Om Prakash, 78, Indian actor.
William Wheeler, 87, English Roman Catholic prelate and bishop.

22
Carlo Dionisotti, 89, Italian literary critic, philologist and essayist.
Alfred Hales, 88, Canadian businessman and politician.
Sandy Hume, 28, American journalist, suicide.
José María de Areilza, Count of Motrico, 88, former Spanish Minister of Foreign Affairs.
Emmy Lou Packard, 83, Californian artist.
Russell Reeder, 95, United States Army officer and author.
Abraham A. Ribicoff, 87, American Democratic Party Party politician.
Athol Rowan, 77, South African international cricket player.
Donald S. Russell, 92, American judge and politician.
Warren B. Woodson, 94, American football, basketball, and baseball coach, colon cancer.
Han Youwen, 85, Chinese general in the National Revolutionary Army.

23
Philip Abbott, 73, American actor, cancer.
Marie Adams, 72, American gospel and R&B singer.
Augusta Braxton Baker, 86, African-American librarian and storyteller.
Keith Christopher, 40, American actor, singer/songwriter and AIDS activist, AIDS.
Chuck Hayward, 78, American motion picture stuntman and actor, Hodgkin's Disease.
Raman Lamba, 38, Indian cricketer, cricket accident.
Sean A. Moore, 33, American fantasy and science fiction writer, car crash.
Potti Prasad, 69, Indian actor.
Ray Stoviak, 82, American baseball player.
Billy Sullivan, 82, American businessman, prostate cancer.

24
Geoffrey Bush, 77, British composer and music scholar, prostate cancer.
Daniel J. Crowley, 76, American art historian and cultural anthropologist, congestive heart failure.
Leonard Daniels, 88, British artist and teacher.
Elinor Field, 96, American film actress.
Clara Fraser, 74, American marxist, feminist and activist, emphysema.
Ernst Gutstein, 73, Austrian operatic baritone.
Harold Keith, 95, American author.
Terry Langford, 31, American convicted murderer, execution by lethal injection.
Milicent Patrick, 82, American actress, makeup artist and animator.
Lalita Pawar, 81, Indian actress.
Antonio Prohías, 77, Cuban cartoonist (Spy vs. Spy), lung cancer.
Abraham Shneior, 69, Israeli basketball player.
Henny Youngman, 91, English-American comedian.

25
Frans Bonduel, 90, Belgian road bicycle racer.
Francesca Braggiotti, 95, Italian dancer and actress.
Joe Gallagher, 83, American baseball player.
Harlan Hatcher, 99, American novelist and university president.
Wanda Jakubowska, 90, Polish film director.
Umberto Mastroianni, 87, Italian abstract sculptor.
W. O. Mitchell, 83, Canadian writer and broadcaster, prostate cancer.
Pruden, 81, Spanish football player.
B. A. Santamaria, 82, Australian anti-communist political activist and journalist, brain cancer.
Rockin' Sidney, 59, American R&B, zydeco and soul musician, throat cancer.
Vico Torriani, 77, Swiss actor and Schlager singer, cancer.
Luigi Veronesi, 89, Italian photographer, painter, and film director.

26
James Algar, 85, American film director, screenwriter and producer.
Jaap ter Haar, 75, Dutch children's author.
Jimmy Hagan, 80, English football player and manager.
Otto Haxel, 88, German nuclear physicist.
Robert Jones, 67, American lawyer, politician and civil rights litigator.
Josef Knottenbelt, 87, Dutch tennis player.
Shirley Ardell Mason, 75, American psychiatric patient and art teacher, breast cancer.
Stepan Neustroev, 75, Soviet officer and World War II hero.
Theodore Schultz, 95, American economist, Nobel Prize laureate.

27
Larry Friend, 62, American basketball player, prostate cancer.
John Harman, 65, Australian politician.
George H. Hitchings, 92, American scientist and Nobel Prize laureate.
Martin Hollis, 59, British philosopher.
Elsy Jacobs, 64, Luxembourgish road bicycle racer.
Gerald David Lascelles, 73, British nobleman.
Jack Micheline, 68, American painter and poet.
Henry Munyaradzi, 66/67, Zimbabwean sculptor.
Alice Rivaz, 96, Swiss author and feminist.
J. T. Walsh, 54, American actor (A Few Good Men, Sling Blade, Backdraft), heart attack.

28
Ivan Arkhipov, 90, Soviet and Russian statesman.
Todd Duncan, 95, American opera singer and actor, heart ailment.
Hildegarde Howard, 96, American paleontologist.
Daniel Katz, 94, American psychologist.
Marie Kettnerová, 86, Czech table tennis player.
Dermot Morgan, 45, Irish comedian and actor (Father Ted), heart attack.
Antonio Quarracino, 74, Argentine Roman Catholic cardinal and archbishop, heart attack.
Arkady Shevchenko, 67, Russian/Soviet diplomat and defector, liver cirrhosis.
Injac Zamputi, 88, Albanian scholar, writer, and historian.

References 

1998-02
 02